The N-Choe is a seasonal stream (the word "choe" means stream in Punjabi) that originates in Chandigarh, Punjab and runs across the Leisure Valley to Kajheri, Mohali (now known as Ajitgarh) Punjab, India, and later merges into the Ghaggar River. The stream runs across Leisure Valley and the PCA Cricket Stadium. It is one of the seasonal rivulets in Chandigarh, which include Sukhna Choe in the East and Patiala Ki Rao in the West. The Choe Nala originates at sector 29 in Chandigarh, Punjab.

It is known as Naalaa, Stadium Wala Naalaa or Ataawa choe among locals.

Route

Chandigarh

The N-choe originates near Punjab Civil Secretariat in sector 2, Chandigarh and passes through Bougainvillea Park in sector 3, Leisure valley park in sector 10, Rose Garden and Shanti Kunj Garden in sector 16 and then through sectors 23, 36, 42, 53, next to village Kajheri in sector 52, next to Burail Jail in sector 51 in Chandigarh.

Mohali

From sector 51 in Chandigarh, N Choe enters Mohali and goes through the sectors 62, 63 Phase 9, 67, 81 and to the Chilla Manauli village. The stream then flows towards Patiala district and enters the Ghaggar river in Haryana.

Pollution 
On 31 July 2010, Punjab Pollution Control Board reported that effluents discharged in N-Choe from Chandigarh were beyond the permissible limit. The analysis revealed that pollution levels such as BOD-150 mg/1 and COD 320 mg/1 was found to be more than the permissible limit of 30 mg/1 and 250 mg/1, respectively. Mohali residents complained that the N-choe was not properly protected and that sewage was found in the water.

References

Mohali
Landforms of Chandigarh
Rivers of India
Rivers of Himachal Pradesh